Lutheran Theological Seminary Saskatoon is a degree-granting theological school affiliated with the University of Saskatchewan.
The seminary was originally created to prepare candidates for Lutheran ministry in Western Canada. It is supported by the four Western synods of the Evangelical Lutheran Church in Canada. LTS provides training for pastors and diaconal ministers; offers Lutheran formation for leaders and laypeople; and advances the study of rural ministry.

History
In 1913 the Evangelical Lutheran Synod of Manitoba and Other Provinces founded the Lutheran College and Seminary (LCS), which finally settled on 8th Street in Saskatoon in 1915. In 1939 the Norwegian Lutheran Church in America established the Luther Theological Seminary, first on the campus of the Lutheran College and Seminary and then, in 1946, on a separate campus in Saskatoon, on Wiggins Avenue. For almost twenty years, Lutherans in Western Canada maintained two theological schools.

A merger occurred in 1965, joining the two organizations into the present Lutheran Theological Seminary Saskatoon, with a faculty of six and a student body of thirty. In 1968 the school moved to the University of Saskatchewan campus and into close proximity of ESC (The College of Emmanuel and St. Chad) and SAC (St. Andrew's College). Even at this early stage, the training was ecumenical; students registered in one school were free to take classes toward their degrees in the other two schools. In the same year, an arrangement was reached with the Central Pentecostal College, now Horizon College and Seminary. In 1969 LTS, ESC and SAC established a Graduate School of Theology which would later be known as the Saskatoon Theological Union. In the late 80s, LTS introduced a non-ordination Master of Theological Studies (MTS) Program and a graduate-level Master of Pastoral Counseling (MPC).

When the ELCIC approved the diaconal ministry roster, the Seminary began to develop a program to address the academic needs of these students. The seminary, in conjunction with the ELCIC's Candidate Committees and the national Program Committee for Leadership in Ministry (PCLM), helps coordinate the recruitment and discernment process for candidates for pastoral leadership.

Presidents

Luther College and Seminary 1911–1965

Juergen Goos, 1911–1918
Henry W. Harms, 1918–1931
Werner Magnus, 1931–1936
Nils Willison, 1937–1949
Earl J. Treusch, 1950–1955
Otto A. Olson, 1955–1958
Walter H.P. Freitag, 1962–1965

Luther Theological Seminary, 1939–1965

John R. Lavik, 1939–1953
Olaf K. Storaasli, 1953–1959
George Evenson, 1959–1965
Lutheran Faculty of Theology
Thomas P. Solem, 1965–1966

Lutheran Theological Seminary Saskatoon

William Hordern, 1965–1985
Roger Nostbakken, 1985–1996
Faith E. Rohrbough, 1996–2004
Erwin Buck, 2004–2005
Kevin A. Ogilvie, 2006-2015
Michael Nel, 2015-2017
William H. Harrison, 2017–present

Programs
The Seminary currently offers:
 Master of Divinity (M.Div.)
 Master of Theological Studies (MTS)
 the Diaconal Certificate Program
 Doctor of Ministry (D.Min.)

Sources

 Lutheran Theological Seminary
 Saskatoon Theologican Union
 ATS profile for Lutheran Theological Seminary

References

University of Saskatchewan
Lutheran seminaries
Educational institutions established in 1913
Seminaries and theological colleges in Canada